Noah Shain is an American record producer and musician. Shain was dubbed "one of the most prominent young producers in the United States” by Mute. He notably produced early work by Grammy Award winning Skrillex "Sonny Moore," as well as albums by As Tall as Lions, Jordan Zevon, Atreyu, The Chevin, and Dead Sara.

Epic Records recording artist Dead Sara stated that Noah was instrumental in making their album sound "As raw as possible." The album has peaked at No. 16 on Billboard's Heatseekers Albums Chart.

Works as a producer (partial list)

References

External links
 noahshain.com

Year of birth missing (living people)
Living people
Musicians from Los Angeles
Record producers from California
American audio engineers
Grammy Award winners